Amal Al-Awadhi is a Kuwaiti actress and TV presenter.

Early life 
َAmal Al-Awadhi was born on 30 March 1989. She started her career at the age of seventeen, when she presented a program for kids named Tilfizyun al atfal (lit. '"TV for kids"'). She graduated from the University of Kuwait with a Bachelor in Political Science and Business Administration in 2010.

Personal life 
In 2008, she married the Kuwaiti businessman Abdullah Al-Awadhi, stopped acting, and concentrated on her family. When she gave birth to her only daughter Munira, she returned to acting.

Amal is often criticized in Kuwait for her lifestyle as too western, getting comments from her followers on social media criticizing her for personal matters such as plastic surgeries or short dresses.

Work

TV Programs 

 "A'inak al watan" (2005)
 "Suhubat mahrajan hala febraier" (2007)
 "Qadha walla" (2007)
 "Jad wa la'ab" (2007)
 "Jad wa la'ab 2" (2008)
 "Ammoula" (2012)
 "Black and white" (2013)
 "Houwa w hi w heya" (2014)
 "Lamset fawz" (2018)

TV Series

Plays 

 "Al qarasina" (2013)

Music Videos 
She acted in two music videos with Iraqi singer and musician Majid Al Mohandis:

 "Ana hannet" (2013)
 "Yalli bahebak mut" (2020)

References 

Living people
Kuwaiti people
Kuwaiti actresses
1989 births